Nong Khai is a city in northeast Thailand. It is the capital of Nong Khai province. Nong Khai city is located in Mueang Nong Khai district.

Nong Khai lies on the Mekong River, near the site of the first Thai–Lao Friendship Bridge, spanning the river to Laos. The Thai-Lao Friendship bridge was largely funded by a gift to the Lao government from the Australian government. It is the road and railway gateway to the Lao capital, Vientiane,  upriver, on the north bank opposite Thailand's Si Chiang Mai district. Construction of a rail spur to Thanaleng outside Vientiane was begun early-2007 and opened 5 March 2009.

History
The Prap Ho Monument before the old city hall (now a museum and cultural center) memorialises the dead of the Haw wars.

Nong Khai has become a popular destination during the Buddhist Lent festival when mysterious balls of light, or Naga fireballs, rise from the Mekong River. The balls resemble an orange sun. They rise out of the river approximately 6–9 meters (20 to 30 feet) and disappear after three to five seconds. Although the fireballs can be seen at other times, most Thais travel to see them during the full moon in October when the incidence of them is considered to be much higher.

Nong Khai's main sight is Sala Keoku (alternatively spelled as Sala Kaew Ku, also known as Wat Khaek), a park of colossal sculptures, some over 20 m tall.  The park is the handiwork of the mystic Luang Pu Bunleua Sulilat, who bought the land in 1978 when he was exiled from his native Laos, where he had built a similar park in Vientiane in the 1950s.  Synthesizing Buddhist and Hinduist ideologies, Buddhas, many-armed goddesses, a seven-headed Naga snake, and various human-animal hybrids dominate the site.

Notable figures from twentieth century Buddhist history have lived in Nong Khai -- the world renowned Buddhist scholar and leading meditation teacher Ajahn Sumedho was ordained in Wat Sisaket in Nong Khai.

Climate

References

External links
 

Populated places in Nong Khai province
Laos–Thailand border crossings
Populated places on the Mekong River
Cities and towns in Thailand
Isan